The 1911 Giro d'Italia was the third edition of the Giro d'Italia, one of cycling's Grand Tours. The field consisted of 86 riders, and 24 riders finished the race.

References

1911 Giro d'Italia
1911